The Candlemass Road is a historical novel from George MacDonald Fraser set in the time of the Border Reivers, a period Fraser had earlier written about in The Steel Bonnets and would later return to in The Reavers.

Fraser later described it as "a rather dark morality tale - at least I meant it to have a moral - in what I hope was a reasonable imitation of Elizabethan English".

The book is mentioned in the film All My Friends Are Leaving Brisbane.

Reception
The Washington Post said "Readers who enjoy a snatch of history brought to life will enjoy this brief but fascinating tale. However, the slightness of the plot, along with the old-fashioned treatment of point of view and the lack of character development, will leave those looking for a satisfying story disappointed."

References

External links
Review of novel at Washington Post

Novels by George MacDonald Fraser
1993 British novels
Border Reivers
Harvill Secker books